Derya Uluğ (born 21 February 1986) is a Turkish singer.

Uluğ was born in İzmir in 1986 as one of four siblings and was raised there. She is of Greek Turkish and Albanian origin. From her childhood, she was interested in music and at the age of 8 took part in a music competition. She studied music and violin at the Muğla University and later graduated from Haliç University Conservatory.

She worked as Ebru Gündeş's backing vocalist for 3 years, until she decided to start her own music career. She released her first single "Okyanus" (Ocean) in 2016. The song was written by herself and Asil Gök, and composed by Burak Yeter. On 13 November 2016, Uluğ won the "Best Newcomer Soloist" award at the  43rd Golden Butterfly Awards.

Discography

Singles

As featured artist
"Sen Maşallah" (with Güven Yüreyi) (2017)
"Ayrılığın Yükü Ağır" (from the album Yıldız Tilbe'nin Yıldızlı Şarkıları) (2018)
"Sürgün Aşkımız" (with Emrah Karaduman) (2018)
"Leyla & Mecnun" (with Cem Belevi) (2020)
"Canım Dediklerim" (from the album Saygı Albümü: Bergen) (2022)
"Hadi Çal" (from the album Serdar Ortaç Şarkıları, Vol. 1) (2022)
"Yazık" (with Ceylan Ertem) (from the album Duyuyor Musun?) (2022)

References

External links 
 

1986 births
Turkish pop singers
Turkish singer-songwriters
Living people
21st-century Turkish singers
21st-century Turkish women singers
Golden Butterfly Award winners
Turkish lyricists